Olfactory receptor 7D4 is a protein that in humans is encoded by the OR7D4 gene.

Function 

Olfactory receptors interact with odorant molecules in the nose, to initiate a neuronal response that triggers the perception of a smell. The olfactory receptor proteins are members of a large family of G protein-coupled receptors (GPCR) arising from single coding-exon genes. Olfactory receptors share a 7-transmembrane domain structure with many neurotransmitter and hormone receptors and are responsible for the recognition and G protein-mediated transduction of odorant signals. The olfactory receptor gene family is the largest in the genome. The nomenclature assigned to the olfactory receptor genes and proteins for this organism is independent of other organisms.

Ligands

 Androstadienone
 Androstenone

People with the OR7D4 R88W/T133M polymorphism are less sensitive to these odorants and find them less offensive smelling, as they are characteristically described as "sweaty".

References 

Olfactory receptors